Poverty and Nobility is a 1954 Italian comedy film directed by Mario Mattoli starring Sophia Loren and Totò.

Plot
The story is taken from the Eduardo Scarpetta's play of the same name.

Naples, second half of the 19th century: impoverished Felice Sciosciamocca tries to work as a scribe for illiterate people, while his friend Don Pasquale tries to make photographs for rich couples. Meanwhile, in the house where the two live, their wives start to fight because the apartment is mortgaged, and the women don't have money to pay the rent. Luckily, rich Count Eugenio, in love with the beautiful dancer Gemma, asks Pasquale and Felice to stage a farce for him. In fact, the father of Gemma - an enriched cook - wants to meet Eugenio's family, but he knows that his real father does not approve of his love affair with the dancer. So Eugenio transforms Don Felice Sciosciamocca into his uncle (the Prince of Casador) and Don Pasquale has to play the true father of Eugenio (Ottavio Favetti). The young count entrusts a false part to each of the members of the two families, except for the second wife of Felice, Concetta.  Count Eugenio cannot find a role for her, and Concetta gets very angry. While Felice and Pasquale are arguing in the beautiful villa of Don Gaetano, Concetta bursts into the home and tries to compromise the plan organized by Eugenio. Don Felice manages to fix the situation and in the end all is resolved.

Cast
Totò as Felice Sciosciammocca
Dolores Palumbo as Luisella 
Enzo Turco as Pasquale 
Valeria Moriconi as Pupella 
Franca Faldini as Nadia 
Liana Billi as Concetta 
Franco Sportelli as Vincenzo 
Gianni Cavalieri as Don Gaetano
Sophia Loren as Gemma 
Carlo Croccolo as Luigino
Giuseppe Porelli as Marquis Ottavio aka "Bebè"
Enzo Petito as Don Gioacchino

References

External links
"Poverty and nobility" 1954 by Mario Mattoli

1954 films
1954 comedy films
1950s Italian-language films
Italian films based on plays
Italian historical comedy films
Films based on works by Eduardo Scarpetta
Films directed by Mario Mattoli
Films set in Naples
Films set in the 19th century
Films with screenplays by Ruggero Maccari
Lux Film films
Minerva Film films
1950s Italian films